Margaret A. Phillips (born November 3, 1959) is an American biologist who is the Sam G. Winstead and F. Andrew Bell Distinguished Chair in Biochemistry at the University of Texas Southwestern Medical Center. She was elected a Fellow of the National Academy of Sciences in 2021.

Early life and education 
Phillips was born in Cleveland. She was an undergraduate student at the University of California, Davis, where she studied biochemistry. In 1981, Philips joined Syva, a biochemistry company in Palo Alto, California. After two years she returned to university, as a graduate student at the University of California, San Francisco and the laboratory of C. C. Wang. She remained at the University of California, San Francisco as a postdoctoral scholar with William J. Rutter.

Research and career 
Phillips was appointed to the faculty at the University of Texas Southwestern Medical Center in 1992, where she was promoted to Carolyn R. Bacon Professor in 2009 and Chair of the Department in 2016. Her research considers the development of novel therapeutic strategies for the treatment of malaria.

Awards and honors 

 1999 Scholar Award in Molecular Parasitology
 2010 Medicines for Malaria Venture Project of the Year
 2021 Elected Fellow of the National Academy of Sciences

Selected publications

References 

1959 births
People from Cleveland
University of California, Davis alumni
University of California, San Francisco alumni
University of Texas Southwestern Medical Center faculty
American women biologists
Malariologists
Living people
21st-century American women